Sunner Kalan (ਸੁੰਨੜ ਕਲਾਂ) is a village in the Jalandhar district of Punjab. It is a part of the Rurka Kalan tehsil in Jalandhar. The people that are from this village often have Sunner (surname) (ਸੁੰਨੜ), Jabber , Gahir Bagha, and Lagah as their surname. Many people from this village have settled abroad in countries like United Kingdom, Australia, New Zealand,  Canada, and USA. It is not far from Nurmahal, and some of the surrounding villages include: Jago Sangha, Sidhu Hari Singh, Ade Kali, Mithra, Pabwan and Bundala.

Villages in Jalandhar district